Heiko März (born 9 July 1965) is a German former professional footballer who played as a defender or midfielder.

He played over 210 top-flight matches in East and unified Germany.

In 1989 he won one cap for the East Germany national team.

References

External links
 
 
 

1965 births
Living people
Sportspeople from Rostock
German footballers
East German footballers
East Germany international footballers
Association football defenders
Association football midfielders
FC Hansa Rostock players
SV Babelsberg 03 players
Bundesliga players
2. Bundesliga players
DDR-Oberliga players
Footballers from Mecklenburg-Western Pomerania